Rakaia is a town in Canterbury, New Zealand. It may also refer to:
 , a British cargo liner in service 1946-71
 Rakaia River, one of the largest braided rivers in New Zealand
 Rakaia Gorge, located on the Rakaia River in inland Canterbury
 Rakaia (New Zealand electorate), a former New Zealand electorate
 Rakaia railway accident, an accident on 11 March 1899 at the Rakaia Railway Station